Lone Star is a wooden hull, steam-powered stern-wheeled towboat in LeClaire, Iowa, United States. She is dry docked and on display at the Buffalo Bill Museum in LeClaire. Built in 1868, she is the oldest of three surviving steam-powered towboats, and the only one with a wooden hull.  She was declared a National Historic Landmark on 20 December 1989.

Description
The internal hogging truss system is typical of boats of the period. The hull is divided internally into three watertight compartments. It has a two-deck superstructure, with the main deck housing the propelling machinery and steam boilers, with coal bins forward, boilers in the center, and engines aft. An upper deck above the boilers that houses the pilot house and crew quarters.

History 
Lone Star came off the ways at Lyons, Iowa in 1869. Originally the boat was a wood-burning side-wheeler, operated as a short-run packet. In 1890 she was remodeled and reconfigured as a stern-wheeler, for use as towboat. Lone Star was remodeled a second time in 1899 at the Kahlke Boat Yards in Rock Island, Illinois.  In 1922 she was again altered, for use in dredging operations.  On 21 April 1968, Lone Star was placed out of service. She was the last running and is now the last remaining intact wood hull paddlewheel boat that plied the Mississippi River.

Photo gallery

See also

List of National Historic Landmarks in Iowa
National Register of Historic Places listings in Scott County, Iowa
List of U.S. National Historic Landmark ships, shipwrecks, and shipyards

References

External links
Video tour of the Lone Star towboat.

National Historic Landmarks in Iowa
Towboats
Tourist attractions in Scott County, Iowa
Ships on the National Register of Historic Places in Iowa
National Register of Historic Places in Scott County, Iowa
Museum ships in Iowa
Le Claire, Iowa
1868 ships